North-Western State is a former administrative division of Nigeria. It was created on 27 May 1967 from parts of the Northern Region and existed until 3 February 1976, when it was divided into two states - Niger and Sokoto. The city of Sokoto was the capital of North-Western State.

North-Western State Governors
Usman Faruk (28 May 1967 - July 1975)
Umaru Mohammed (July 1975 - 1976)

References 

Former Nigerian administrative divisions
States and territories established in 1967
States and territories disestablished in 1976